Roundness is the measure of how closely the shape of an object approaches that of a circle.

It may also refer to:
Roundness (geology), the roundness of clastic particles
Roundness (handwriting), the sharpness of handwriting patterns

See also
 Roundedness
 Round (disambiguation)